1 Pace Plaza is the flagship building complex of Pace University in New York City, located directly across from the City Hall and adjacent to the Brooklyn Bridge ramp in the Civic Center neighborhood of Manhattan. The building houses the classrooms, administrative offices, a  student union, the 750-seat community theater of the Michael Schimmel Center for the Arts, the Peter Fingesten Gallery, and an 18-floor high-rise known as Maria's Tower. The 5th through 17th floors of Maria's Tower houses approximately 500 freshmen residents and the 18th floor holds university administrative offices.

History 
Construction on 1 Pace Plaza started in December 1966 and was completed in 1970 on the site of the former New York Tribune Building. It was part of the 1960s Brooklyn Bridge Title I Project, which included the Southbridge Towers, the Beekman Hospital (now New York Downtown Hospital) and the World Trade Center.

The architects of 1 Pace Plaza were Eggers & Higgins. Israeli sculptor Nehemia Azaz, working with Paul Lampl, Chief Designer at Eggers & Higgins, created the "Brotherhood of Man" copper prismed sculpture that still adorns the Pace Plaza entrance on Frankfort Street.

References

Pace Press: Function and style: The origin of One Pace Plaza

External links
Pace University
The Art of Pace, Fall 2014, p.26

1970 establishments in New York City
University and college buildings completed in 1970
Pace University
Civic Center, Manhattan
University and college buildings in the United States
Buildings and structures in Manhattan